This is a list of countries by westernmost point on land (dependent territories included). A selection of dependent territories are listed in italics and are not ranked.

There are five countries with territory on both sides of the 180th meridian, and thus can be said to be both the westernmost and easternmost countries: Russia, New Zealand, Fiji, United States, and Kiribati (as well as Antarctica). Russia, New Zealand, and Fiji have most of their territories west of the 180th meridian, in the Eastern Hemisphere, so they are considered in this article to belong to the easternmost countries with their territory stretching east beyond the 180th meridian into the Western Hemisphere. Conversely, the United States and Kiribati have most of their territories east of the 180th meridian, into the Western Hemisphere, so they are considered to belong to the westernmost countries, with their territory stretching west beyond the 180th meridian into the Eastern Hemisphere.

See also

Westernmost point
Geography-related lists